The Troy Trojans women's basketball program is the intercollegiate women's basketball of Troy University.  The program is classified in the NCAA's Division I and the team competes in the Sun Belt Conference.

The head coach of the Trojans is Chanda Rigby, who is in her third season at Troy.  During her first five seasons as head coach at Troy, the Trojans have made three NCAA Tournament appearances, one WBI Tournament appearance, and have won two Sun Belt Tournament titles and one National Championship.

The team plays home games in Trojan Arena, which was built in 2012 and replaced the old arena known as Sartain Hall.

History

Joyce Sorrell era

Troy's first season was in 1975 under then head coach Joyce Sorrell.  Before Sorrell started the basketball program, Troy had no women's sports.  Sorrell is considered the "mother of women's athletics" at Troy University.  Sorrell maintained consistent winning records for her women's basketball teams.  In 1978, she helped guide Troy to an upset win over Florida State, 80–63.

The next season (1978-1979), Sorrell scored an upset win over in-state opponent Auburn by a score of 76–70, and a few games later defeated Alabama, 85–80.  The Lady Trojans would finish that season with a 21–9 record.  For the 1979–1980 season, Sorrell once again led her team to more big wins, defeating Florida State and Florida in consecutive days.  The Lady Trojans fell short in the state AIAW Tournament, but finished with a 19–11 record.

Sorrell's 1980-81 team won an Alabama AIAW State Championship and posted an 18-16 overall record on the season. Sorrell coached Troy's first ever All-American in Denise Monroe during this time, from 1977 to 1981.

Joyce Sorrell led the women's basketball program through seven years (1975–82) as a member of the Association for Intercollegiate Athletics for Women (AIAW) before the NCAA began sponsoring championships in women's athletics in 1982. She then helped the program transfer from NCAA Division II to Division I in 1993-94 before retiring from coaching in 1995.  She also coached nine 1,000-point scorers and 17 all-conference selections while coaching the Trojans through four different conferences, plus two seasons as an NCAA Division II independent.

Jerry Hester era

Upon taking over the head coaching position on an interim basis after Joyce Sorrell retired, Jerry Hester was hired as the full-time head coach.  In 1997, his second season as head coach, he guided the Lady Trojans to their first Division I conference championship, winning the Mid-Continent Conference tournament and receiving their first-ever berth to the NCAA Tournament.  Troy lost that year in the First Round of the tournament to #12 Virginia, finishing with a 23-7 overall record.  Hester earned the Mid-Con's Coach of the Year honor that same year.

The following season (1997-1998), Hester started out the year with a 72–69 win at home against Mississippi State, but wasn't able to sustain the momentum throughout the season, finishing with just a 13-14 overall record.

After struggling to find the same success he had in his first couple of seasons as head coach, Hester resigned from his position in 2002.

Michael Murphy era

In 2002, Michael Murphy was hired as the third women's basketball head coach at Troy.  Murphy had previously been an assistant for the Alabama men's and women's basketball teams between 1997 and 2002.

Murphy steadily improved the Trojans as the school transitioned from the Atlantic Sun Conference to the Sun Belt Conference beginning in the 2005–06 season.  Murphy was never able to take Troy back to the success they had seen under Joyce Sorrell though, as he never garnered any championships and had only two winning seasons.  In Murphy's last two seasons as head coach, Troy had accumulated a record of 7–51 in two seasons, which led Troy to fire Murphy in 2012.

Murphy finished with a 110-179 overall record.

Chanda Rigby era

Chanda Rigby was hired in 2002 after previously being the long-time head coach for Pensacola State College, where she won a state championship and took them to the NJCAA Final Four in each of her last two seasons.  She led the Pirates to a combined 64–6 record over her last two seasons at the school.

Upon Rigby coming to Troy, she immediately converted Troy to a fast-pace philosophy basketball team, which is what led to her success at the NJCAA level.  Troy quickly became known for its high-scoring offense and up-tempo playing style over the next couple of years.

In the 2014–2015 season, in just her third season at the helm, Rigby led Troy to their first 20-win season in 18 years, finishing with a 20–11 record and a berth into the WBI Tournament.  Troy would wind up losing in the First Round of the tournament to Mercer, 68–83.

For the next season, Rigby led Troy to their second-straight 20-win season, finishing the 2015–16 season with a 20–13 record and a Sun Belt Conference tournament championship.  This marked the first time Troy had consecutive seasons with 20 wins or more.  The Trojans would receive a berth into the NCAA tournament as a #15-seed, only to lose to #2 Oregon State, 31–73.

Rigby followed up her successes with yet another 20-win season in 2016–17, this time finishing with a 22–11 record.  Troy would garner consecutive wins against Villanova and Loyola-Chicago in the San Juan Shootout during the first half of the season.  Troy finished 3rd-place in the Sun Belt standings, garnering a #3-seed for the Sun Belt Tournament.  After defeating Arkansas State, UT-Arlington, and Louisiana in consecutive games, Troy won their second-straight Sun Belt Conference tournament championship.  Troy received their second berth in as many years to the NCAA tournament, losing in the First Round #2 Mississippi State.

Troy would make their way back into the postseason once again during the 2018–2019 season, making their first-ever appearance in the WNIT.  Troy finished the season with a 22-9 overall record, which included a 71–54 win over Ole Miss during the season.

In Rigby's best season at Troy to date, the 2019-2020 Trojans cruised through Sun Belt play with a 16-2 conference record and was crowned regular season Sun Belt Champions, earning the #1-seed in the Sun Belt Conference Tournament.  On March 12, 2020 the Sun Belt Conference cancelled their conference tournament due to the COVID-19 pandemic, leading to Troy being awarded the automatic bid to the NCAA Tournament due to them being the regular season champion.  Shortly thereafter on the same day, the NCAA cancelled the NCAA Tournament, and all other conferences cancelled their tournaments as well.  The Trojans ultimately finished the season with a 25-4 overall record, the best in school history.

Following the historic 2019-2020 season, Troy was able to once again capture the Sun Belt title during the 2020-2021 season, this time by winning the Sun Belt Conference tournament.  Troy would defeat Louisiana in the finals of the tournament by a score of 73-65.  After receiving the #15 seed to the NCAA Tournament, the team would face the #2-seed Texas A&M in the first round, losing in the last seconds on what was a controversial missed call by the officials.  The final score would be 84-80, in favor of the Aggies.

In Troy's 2021-2022 season, the Trojans scored an upset over Mississippi State by a score of 73-66.

Coaches

Records updated as of 3/28/2022.

All-Americans
 Ashley Beverly-Kelley – CollegeSportsMadness.com Mid-Major All-American Third Team (2015)
 Donette McNair - National Strength and Conditioning Association (NCSA) All-American (2011)
 Denise Monroe  – AIAW All-American Second Team (1981)

Award Winners/Finalists
 World Exposure Assistant Coach of the Year
Neil Harrow – 2020

 Nancy Lieberman Award
Joanna Harden – 2014 (Finalist)

 NSCA All-American Athlete of the Year Award
Donette McNair  – 2011

Postseason Results

NCAA tournament results

WNIT Tournament Results

WBI Tournament results

AIAW Regional Tournament Results

Championships/Titles
1981 – Alabama AIAW State Champions
1994 - East Coast Conference Regular Season Champions
1997 – Mid-Continent Conference Regular Season Champions
1997 – Mid-Continent Conference Tournament Champions
2016 – Sun Belt Conference Tournament Champions
2017 – Sun Belt Conference Tournament Champions
2020 – Sun Belt Conference Regular Season Champions
2021 – Sun Belt Conference East Division Champions
2021 – Sun Belt Conference Tournament Champions
2022 – Sun Belt Conference Regular Season Champions

Mid-Major Top 25 Rankings

Yearly Results

References

External links